The 1999 Critérium du Dauphiné Libéré was the 51st edition of the cycle race and was held from 6 June to 13 June 1999. The race started in Autun and finished in Aix-les-Bains. The race was won by Alexander Vinokourov of the Casino team.

Teams
Twelve teams, containing a total of 96 riders, participated in the race:

Route

General classification

Notes

References

Further reading

External links

1999
1999 in French sport
June 1999 sports events in Europe